O'Dea Castle, also known as Dysert O'Dea Castle, is an Irish fortified tower house, loosely described as a castle at Dysert O'Dea, the former O'Dea clan stronghold,  from Corofin, County Clare. The tower is adjacent to Dysert O'Dea Monastery, close to the R476 road.

History
The Battle of Dysert O'Dea, which drove the Anglo-Normans from the region for over 200 years, took place at this site on 10 May 1318. The castle was built between 1470 and 1490 by Diarmaid O'Dea, Lord of Cineal Fearmaic. The Earl of Ormond took the castle from the O'Dea clan in 1570 by force. By 1584, however, they had regained it. At that time, Domhnall Maol O'Dea was listed as owner. Domhnall supported the northern Chiefs in the Nine Years' War of 1594-1603 and subsequently Dysert Castle fell to the Protestant Bishop of Kildare, Daniel Neylon, who in 1594 bequeathed it to his son, John. The castle soon returned to the O'Dea clan. Conor Cron O'Dea supported the Confederates and participated in the successful siege of Ballyalla Castle in 1642.

After the fall of Limerick in 1651 to the Cromwellian forces, they maintained a small garrison here. When they left, the soldiers demolished the battlements, upper floors and staircase. The Neylon family then returned but during the reign of Charles II, Conor Cron O'Dea regained the castle. Conor's sons, Michael and James, supported the cause of James II and once again lost the castle. The lands passed to the Synge family but the castle eventually and gradually fell into ruin.

In 1970, John O'Day of Wisconsin Rapids, Wisconsin (USA) purchased the tower and had it restored. The castle was then leased to the Dysert Development Association, which, with support from the Irish Tourist Board, opened it as "The Dysert O'Dea Castle Archaeology Centre" in 1986. It showed an exhibition of local artefacts from the Stone Age to 1922.

Today
Today, the centre is known as the Clare Archaeology Centre, with exhibits of local archaeological artefacts from 1000 BC to 1700 AD, local history over the last three centuries, and a wall walk of parts of the castle. The Dysert O'Dea Archeology Trail includes sites around the tower, including the remains of the Dysert O'Dea Monastery.

See also
 Tower houses in Britain and Ireland

References

Further reading
 O'Dea: Ua Deághaidh: The Story of a Rebel Clan, by Risteárd Ua Cróinín (Richard Cronin), Ballinakella Press, Whitegate, Co. Clare, Ireland, 1992. .
 Irish Battles – A Military History of Ireland, by G.A. Hayes-McCoy, Appletree Press, 1990,

External links

 Clare Archaeology Centre – official site
 O'Dea Clan Site

Castles in County Clare
Historic house museums in the Republic of Ireland
Museums in County Clare
Archaeological museums in the Republic of Ireland
Tower houses in the Republic of Ireland